Shankill may refer to various places in Ireland:

Northern Ireland
 Belfast Shankill (Northern Ireland Parliament constituency) (1929–1972)
 Belfast Shankill (UK Parliament constituency) (1918–1922)
 Shankill, County Antrim, a parish in County Antrim
 Shankill, County Armagh, a townland in County Armagh
 Shankill, County Down, a parish situated partly in Counties Down and Armagh
 Shankill, County Fermanagh, a townland in County Fermanagh
 Shankill Road, a road and electoral ward in West Belfast, passes through an area known as The Shankill

Republic of Ireland
 Shankill, County Roscommon, a civil parish in County Roscommon
 Shankill, Dublin, a suburb of Dublin in Dun Laoghaire-Rathdown
 Shankill railway station, serving the suburb and Rathmichael